Dimitri Jiriakov (born 8 November 1985 in Moscow) is a Liechtenstein cyclist.

Major results

2001
 1st Games of the Small States of Europe, Road race
2006
 1st National Road Race Championships
2007
 1st National Road Race Championships
 1st National Time Trial Championships
2008
 1st National Road Race Championships
 1st National Time Trial Championships
 6th Overall Jelajah Malaysia

References

1985 births
Living people
Liechtenstein male cyclists